Fargana Alim qizi Qasimova (born August 6, 1979) is an Azerbaijani mugham singer in Azerbaijan. She is the daughter of famous mugham singer Alim Qasimov. She has twice received presidential awards for the promotion of Azerbaijani music, in 2012 and 2014.

Biography
In 1995, at the age of sixteen, Qasimova joined Alim Qasimov on his concert tour to Germany for the first time. By the age of twenty she had become a full-fledged singer in her own right, and Qasimov chose to include his daughter in his ensemble. Farghana first appeared on 1997's The Legendary Art of Mugham, on which the two shared vocal tasks on the song Getme Getme. Their next album included a track, Bagishlamani, dedicated to his colleague, Nusrat Fateh Ali Khan. The release marked a high point for Qasimov as it was his first widely available release to western audiences and it proved a critical success. Qasimova's efforts, with her father's guidance, to reconnect younger generations with mugham began to pay dividends; not only was he appealing to traditional Islamic sections of the Azerbaijani population, but also to more Americanised and modern audiences. The breakthrough amongst the younger generations spurred him on: "Sometimes young people come up after a concert to thank me. That's like giving me wings. I feel so elated when I can awaken such feelings in people while they are still young; mugham is not an easy genre for young people to understand".

In 1999, Qasimova with her father participated in “The Spirit of the East” concert directed and composed by Israeli Mizrahi musician Peretz Eliyahu and Mark Eliyahu.

In 2007, she recorded and released further  Central Asian Series, Vol. 6: Spiritual Music of Azerbaijan with her father. She also took the opportunity to perform in New York City in 2005 as part of Yo-Yo Ma's Silk Road Project. The concert aimed to promote multi-cultural artistic exchange between eastern and western cultures and The New York Times regarded her performance, alongside Malik Mansurov and Rauf Islamov, as the highlight of the event.

In 2002, she made her first appearance as a soloist at the Women's Voices Festival in Belgium.

In 2014, she released Yalniz Ona Doghru, which became her first album. In the same year, she gave her first solo concert in Baku.

Discography

Albums
The Legendary Art of Mugham (October 15, 1997) with Alim Qasimov Ensemble
Love's Deep Ocean (October 11, 1999) with Alim Qasimov
Central Asian Series, Vol. 6: Spiritual Music of Azerbaijan (September 25, 2007) with Alim Qasimov
"Intimate dialogue" – Live at Morgenland Festival Osnabrück 2009 with Alim Qasimov
Durnalar (May 12, 2014)

References

Further reading

Alim and Fergana Qasimov: The Master and his Pearl Interview with Qasimov in Al-Ahram Weekly

External links
Alim and Ferghana Qasimov performing live

1979 births
Living people
21st-century Azerbaijani women singers
People from Shamakhi
Mugham singers